Stolwijk is a town in the Dutch province of South Holland. It is a part of the municipality of Krimpenerwaard, and lies about 6 km southeast of Gouda.

In 2005, the town of Stolwijk had 4980 (2487 men en 2493 women) inhabitants. The built-up area of the town was 0.80 km², and contained 1367 residences.
The statistical area "Stolwijk", which also can include the peripheral parts of the village, as well as the surrounding countryside, has a population of around 3660.

Stolwijk was a separate municipality until 1985, when it became part of Vlist.

References

Populated places in South Holland
Former municipalities of South Holland
Krimpenerwaard